Guglielmo Barnabò (11 May 1888 – 31 May 1954) was an Italian stage and film actor. He appeared in more than 90 films between 1926 and 1954.

Life and career 
Born in Ancona, Barnabò made his stage debut in 1921 at the Greek Theatre of Syracuse, with the Annibale Ninchi's company. Since then he was enrolled by some of the most important stage companies of his time, working among others with Marta Abba, Alda Borelli, Maria Melato, Gino Cervi, Paolo Stoppa.  

In 1927 Barnabò made his screen debut in the silent film Beauty of the World, but his film career took off with the sound cinema, when he became one of the most active character actors of the 1930s and the 1940s.  Specialized in good-natured and bourgeois character roles, he is best known as the villain capitalist in Vittorio De Sica's  Miracle in Milan. 

Barnabò was married to actress , with whom he often worked in films and on stage.

Selected filmography

 Beauty of the World (1927)
 The Last Adventure (1932)
 Bad Subject (1933)
 Red Passport (1935)
 Sette giorni all'altro mondo (1936)
 The Ancestor (1936)
 Marcella (1937)
 To Live (1937)
 I Want to Live with Letizia (1938)
 The Cuckoo Clock (1938)
 Marionette (1939)
 Unjustified Absence (1939)
 The Dream of Butterfly (1939)
 We Were Seven Sisters (1939)
 Heartbeat (1939)
 Guest for One Night (1939)
 Manon Lescaut (1940)
 Non me lo dire! (1940)
 The First Woman Who Passes (1940)
 Teresa Venerdì (1941)
 The Man on the Street  (1941)
 Marco Visconti (1941)
 Scampolo (1941)
 Document Z-3 (1942)
 The Peddler and the Lady (1943)
 Music on the Run (1943)
 Short Circuit (1943)
 Come Back to Sorrento (1945)
 Mad About Opera (1948)
 Be Seeing You, Father (1948)
 Adam and Eve (1949)
 Figaro Here, Figaro There (1950)
 The Last Days of Pompeii (1950)
 Accidents to the Taxes!! (1951)
 Briscola (1951)
 Miracle in Milan (1951)
 The Ungrateful Heart (1951)
 The Two Sergeants (1951)
 Poppy (1952)
 It's Never Too Late (1953)
 Sunday Heroes (1953)
 Pane, Amore e Fantasia (1953)

References

External links

1888 births
1954 deaths
Italian male film actors
Italian male stage actors
Italian male silent film actors
People from Ancona
20th-century Italian male actors